The 1989 FIBA Americas Championship for Women, was the first FIBA Americas Championship for Women regional basketball championship held by FIBA Americas, which also served as Americas qualifier for the 1990 FIBA World Championship for Women, granting berths to the top four teams in the final standings. It was held in Brazil between 6 August and 13 August 1989. Eight national teams entered the event under the auspices of FIBA Americas, the sport's regional governing body. The city of São Paulo hosted the tournament. Cuba won their first title after defeating hosts Brazil in the final.

Format
Teams were split into two round-robin groups of four teams each. The top two teams from each group advanced to the second stage and qualified directly to the 1990 FIBA World Championship for Women. The second stage consisted of another round robin group of four teams, where the top two teams played an extra game for the championship, and the other two teams played for third place.
The teams that did not advance to the second round played in a knockout bracket to define places fifth through eighth in the final standings.

First round

Group A

|}

Group B

|}

Classification stage

Second stage

|}

Third place

Final

Final standings

The United States already qualified for the World Championship by virtue of winning the 1988 Olympics.

External links
Women Basketball I America World Qualification 1989, todor66.com. Retrieved January 22, 2015.

FIBA Women's AmeriCup
1989 in women's basketball
1989 in Brazilian sport
International women's basketball competitions hosted by Brazil
International sports competitions in São Paulo
1989–90 in North American basketball
1989–90 in South American basketball